Nadine Delache (born 7 February 1941) is a French former swimmer. She competed in the women's 100 metre backstroke at the 1960 Summer Olympics.

References

External links
 

1941 births
Living people
Olympic swimmers of France
Swimmers at the 1960 Summer Olympics
French female backstroke swimmers